The Latin American Herald Tribune (LAHT) is an online-only newspaper with headquarters in Caracas, Venezuela. It is aimed at English-reading people who want to be informed about Latin America. The publication identifies itself as the successor of the defunct Venezuelan newspaper The Daily Journal. Russell M. Dallen Jr. was  the president and editor-in-chief from 2008 to his death in 2021.

See also
 List of newspapers in Venezuela

References

English-language websites
Venezuelan news websites